Fortescue is an English surname that originated from the old Norman epithet Fort-Escu ("strong shield"). People with the surname include:

 Adrian Fortescue (martyr), 16th-century English nobleman beatified by Roman Catholic Church
 Adrian Fortescue (priest), 19th-20th century Roman Catholic liturgist and Byzantine scholar
 Anthony Fortescue (1535–1608), English conspirator
 Charles Granville Fortescue (1861–1951), British Army officer
 Charles Legeyt Fortescue (1876–1936), a Canadian-born electrical engineer
 Chichester Parkinson-Fortescue, 1st Baron Carlingford
 Chichester Fortescue (disambiguation)
 Chichester Fortescue (1718–1757), MP for Trim
 Chichester Fortescue (1750–1820), Admiral and MP for Trim, son of the above
 Chichester Fortescue (1777–1826), MP for Hillsborough, nephew of the above
 Chichester Parkinson-Fortescue, 1st Baron Carlingford (1823–1898), Liberal politician, son of the above
 Denzil Fortescue, 6th Earl Fortescue
Eleanor Fortescue-Brickdale, (1872 – 1945), English artist
 Edmund Fortescue (disambiguation)
 Edmund Fortescue (died 1624) (1560–1624), English MP
 Edmund Fortescue (died 1647) (1610–1647), English royalist commander
 Sir Edmund Fortescue, 1st Baronet (1642–1666)
 Francis Fortescue (ca. 1563-1624), English politician
 Francis Fortescue Urquhart (1868–1934), an English academic
 Grace Fortescue (1883-1979), a New York socialite who killed a defendant charged with the rape of her daughter
 George Fortescue (c.1578–1659), English essayist and poet
 Harriet Angelina Fortescue (1825–1889), a British writer on international affairs
 Henry Fortescue (Lord Chief Justice) of Ireland
 Hugh Fortescue (disambiguation)
 Hugh Fortescue (1665–1719), British politician
 Hugh Fortescue, 1st Earl Fortescue (1753–1841), British peer
 Hugh Fortescue, 2nd Earl Fortescue (1783–1861), British Whig politician
 Hugh Fortescue, 3rd Earl Fortescue (1818–1905), British peer and politician
 Hugh Fortescue, 4th Earl Fortescue (1854–1932), English Liberal politician
 Hugh Fortescue, 5th Earl Fortescue (1888–1958), British peer and Conservative politician
 John Fortescue (disambiguation)
John Fortescue (judge) (c. 1394–1479), English lawyer and judge, MP for Tavistock, Totnes, Plympton Erle and Wiltshire
John Fortescue of Salden, the seventh Chancellor of the Exchequer of England, serving from 1589 until 1603
 John Fortescue (military historian), (1859–1933), historian of the British army
 John Fortescue Aland, 1st Baron Fortescue of Credan
 Lady Margaret Fortescue (1923-2013), one of the UK's largest private landowners
 Michael Fortescue, a linguist specializing in Arctic and native North American languages
 Nicholas Fortescue the Elder (1575?-1633), chamberlain of the exchequer
 Nicholas Fortescue the Younger (1605?–1644), knight of St John
 Richard Fortescue (disambiguation)
 Rosie Fortescue in Made in Chelsea
 Tim Fortescue, a British politician
 Thomas Fortescue (disambiguation)
Thomas Fortescue (1683–1769), Irish politician,  MP for Dundalk 1727–60
Thomas Fortescue, 1st Baron Clermont (1815–1887), Irish Whig politician
Thomas Fortescue (1744–1799),  MP for Trim in the Irish House of Commons 1768–99
Thomas Fortescue (secretary) (1784–1872), Anglo-Indian civilian and secretary
 William Fortescue (disambiguation)
William Fortescue (judge) (1687–1749), British judge, Master of the Rolls 1741-1749
William Fortescue (died 1629) (c.1562-1629), MP for Sudbury, Chipping Wycombe and Stockbridge
William Fortescue, 1st Earl of Clermont (1722–1806), Irish politician
William Fortescue, 2nd Viscount Clermont (1764–1829), Irish politician, nephew of the above
 Winifred Fortescue, actress and writer

Characters
 J. Fortescue, a nonexistent doctor created as a hoax, supposedly a founder of the International Board of Hygiene
 Camilla Fortescue-Cholmondeley-Browne, a character on the BBC series Call the Midwife
 Florean Fortescue, character in Harry Potter

References